The World's Greatest Entertainer is the second album released by Doug E. Fresh. It was released in 1988 on Reality Records, a short-lived subsidiary of Fantasy Records, and was produced by Doug E. Fresh, Eric "Vietnam" Sadler, Ollie Cotton and Carl Ryder. The album gained a fair amount of success, peaking at #88 on the Billboard 200 and #7 on the Top R&B/Hip-Hop Albums, and featured the single "Keep Risin' to the Top," which peaked at #4 on the Hot R&B/Hip-Hop Singles & Tracks.

Track listing
"Guess? Who?" - 4:26  
"Every Body Got 2 Get Some" - 3:45  
"D.E.F. = Doug E. Fresh" - 4:12  
"On the Strength" - 2:50  
"Keep Risin’ to the Top" - 3:50  
"Greatest Entertainer" - 4:42  
"I'm Gettin’ Ready" - 4:52  
"Cut That Zero" - 3:53  
"The Plane (So High)" - 4:04  
"Ev’rybody Loves a Star" - 4:00  
"Crazy ’Bout Cars" - 4:30  
"Africa (Goin’ Back Home)" - 3:33

Samples list
"On the Strength"
"Mother Popcorn" by James Brown
"Keep Risin' To The Top"
"Keep Rising To The Top" by Keni Burke
"Ain't No Half Steppin'" by Heatwave
"Cut that Zero"
"Casanova" by LeVert
"Ev'rybody Loves a Star"
"One More Chance" by The Jackson 5
"In the Air Tonight Tonight" by Phil Collins
"Uphill Peace of Mind" by Kid Dynamite

Charts

Weekly charts

Year-end charts

References 

1988 albums
Doug E. Fresh albums
Fantasy Records albums